The parasternal lymph nodes (or sternal glands) are placed at the anterior ends of the intercostal spaces, by the side of the internal thoracic artery.

They derive afferents from the mamma; from the deeper structures of the anterior abdominal wall above the level of the umbilicus; from the upper surface of the liver through a small group of glands which lie behind the xiphoid process; and from the deeper parts of the anterior portion of the thoracic wall.

Their efferents usually unite to form a single trunk on either side; this may open directly into the junction of the internal jugular and subclavian veins, or that of the right side may join the right subclavian trunk, and that of the left the thoracic duct. The parasternal lymph nodes drain into the bronchomediastinal trunks, in a similar fashion to the upper intercostal lymph nodes.

References

External links
 

Lymphatics of the torso